The 1996–97 Australian Baseball League Championship was won by the Perth Heat, who defeated the Brisbane Bandits 2 game to 1 in the championship series at ANZ Stadium. The finals series was played in Brisbane even though it was Perth Heats home series, their home ground the WACA was being used for an interstate Sheffield Shield Cricket match.

Ladder

Championship series

Semi Final 1: Game 1: 1st Vs 4th at the WACA

Semi Final 1: Game 2: 1st Vs 4th at the WACA

Semi Final 2: Game 1: 2nd Vs 3rd at ANZ Stadium

Semi Final 2: Game 2: 2nd Vs 3rd at ANZ Stadium

Final Series: Game 1: Winner Semi Final 1 Vs Winner Semi Final 2 at ANZ Stadium

Final Series: Game 2: Winner Semi Final 1 Vs Winner Semi Final 2 at ANZ Stadium

Final Series: Game 3: Winner Semi Final 1 Vs Winner Semi Final 2 at ANZ Stadium

Awards

Top Stats

All-Star Team

References

Australian Baseball League (1989–1999) seasons
1996 in Australian baseball
1997 in Australian baseball